Group A of the 2019 CONCACAF Gold Cup took place from 15 to 23 June 2019. The group consisted of Canada, Cuba, Martinique, and Mexico. The top two teams, Mexico and Canada, advanced to the knockout stage.

Teams

Notes

Standings

In the quarter-finals:
The winners of Group A, Mexico, advanced to play the runners-up of Group B, Costa Rica.
The runners-up of Group A, Canada, advanced to play the winners of Group B, Haiti.

Matches

Canada vs Martinique

Mexico vs Cuba

Cuba vs Martinique

Mexico vs Canada

Canada vs Cuba

Martinique vs Mexico

Discipline
Fair play points would have been used as tiebreakers if the overall and head-to-head records of teams were tied. These were calculated based on yellow and red cards received in all group matches as follows:
first yellow card: minus 1 point;
indirect red card (second yellow card): minus 3 points;
direct red card: minus 4 points;
yellow card and direct red card: minus 5 points;

Only one of the above deductions were applied to a player in a single match.

References

External links
 

Group A